Zorya (Cyrillic: Зоря) is the debut release by the Canadian-Ukrainian singer-songwriter Luba, then known under her full name, Lubomyra Kowalchyk. It is a collaboration with an ensemble, called "Via Zorya" (Вiа Зоря). The album was recorded and released around 1975 on vinyl LP. The vinyl is still in print and the album has been made available as a digital download on various online stores.

Track listing
All songs are traditional

Personnel
 Lubomyra Kowalchuk - vocal, piano 
 Jaroslaw Gudzio - guitar, acoustic guitar
 Kevin Connolly - bass, piano, vocals
 Peter Marunczak - drums, percussion
 Lesia Zinko - percussion

External links
 Zorya at Discogs
 Zorya at RateYourMusic

1975 debut albums
Luba (singer) albums